Rucalonco Airport,  is an airport serving the Paredones commune in the O'Higgins Region of Chile.

The airport is on the Pacific coast,  down the coast from Pichilemu. The runway slope rises to the northeast. Southwest approach and departure are over the water.

See also

Transport in Chile
List of airports in Chile

References

External links
OpenStreetMap - Rucalonco
OurAirports - Rucalonco
FallingRain - Rucalonco Airport

Airports in Chile
Airports in O'Higgins Region